Iveta is a 2022 Czech Biographical miniseries directed by director Michal Samir, who also wrote the screenplay for it. The series was filmed under the brand Voyo Original and was published on the Voyo platform. After The Roubal Case, Guru and Národní házená, this is the fourth series filmed under the banner Voyo Original. Anna Fialová, Vojtěch Vodochodský, Ondřej Gregor Brzobohatý, Eliška Křenková, Miroslav Hanuš, Alena Mihulová, Igor Chmela and Jan Vondráček appeared in the main roles of the series. Series is based on life of Czech singer, actress and celebrity Iveta Bartošová.

Season one consisting three episodes were published on Voyo one week apart from 6 to 20 May 2022. After the airing of the three episodes, which were originally intended to form a three-part miniseries, a second season was announced. It is set in 1990s. The second season started filming on 6 October 2022 until 13 November 2022, when it was finished.

Plot 
Iveta is a girl from Frenštát pod Radhoštěm who wants to be a famous singer. Such path leads her from a children's choir through singing competitions where she records her first hit and album which gives her national fame. Series shows her first singing steps in the local choir, thanks to which the local choirmaster recommends her to participate in the talent competition Young Song in Jihlava. Iveta has to convince parents, judges, producers, viewers. The only one who believes in her from the beginning is a singer Petr Sepeši. After moving to Prague, she records a mega hit song Knoflíky lásky. The two singers become a nation's beloved couple. However, Sepeši's tragic accident intervenes in the future of Iveta Bartošová.

Cast and characters 
 Anna Fialová as Iveta Bartošová
 Vojtěch Vodochodský as Petr Sepéši
 Ondřej Gregor Brzobohatý as Ladislav Štaidl
 Eliška Křenková as Ivana Bartošová
 Miroslav Hanuš as Karel Bartoš
 Alena Mihulová as Svatava Bartošová
 Ondřej Ruml as Karel Gott
 Saša Rašilov as Karel Svoboda
 Rudolf Hrušínský jr. as actor Rudolf
 Igor Chmela as producer Vlasta Krejza
 Jan Vondráček as Kraus
 Jana Boušková as Štěpničková
 Robert Mikluš as professor Evžen Dubecký
 Marta Dancingerová as	Věra
 Mia Petráňová as Iveta Bartošová (10 year old)
 Terezie Holá as Ivana Bartošová (10 year old)
 Ivan Shvedoff as Ivan Karevaev
 Miroslav Hruška as Pavel Fojtek
 Daniel Kadlec as Karel Bláha
 Patricie Pagáčová as Anežka Bláhová

References

External links 
 Official page
 

TV Nova (Czech TV channel) original programming
Czech biographical television series
Czech drama television series
2022 Czech television series debuts
Czech television miniseries